Bencivenga is a surname. Notable people with the surname include:

Fabio Bencivenga (born 1976), Italian water polo player
Angelo Bencivenga (born 1991), Italian footballer